Margot Canaday is an American historian and academic. Her research focuses on Gender and sexuality studies in modern America.

She is also an assistant professor of history at Princeton University.

Canaday is known for her book The Straight State: Sexuality and Citizenship in 20th Century America for which she received the Lambda Literary Award for LGBT Studies at 22nd Lambda Literary Awards.

Education

She earned her Bachelors of Arts degree in American Studies from the University of Iowa and her PhD in History from the University of Minnesota.

Research and career

Her first book, The Straight State: Sexuality and Citizenship in Twentieth Century America received the Ellis W. Hawley Prize and Lambda Literary Award.

She draws on archival government documents to trace how the federal government expanded its bureaucratic reach in response to the rising visibility of sexual minorities.

Canaday published her second book Queer Career: Sexuality and Work in Modern America, in which she interviews queer-identified people who had participated in the labor force as far back as the 1950s.

She found that queer individuals were too absorbed in the stress and anxiety of understanding who they were to adequately focus on education and career.

Selected publications

References

Living people
University of Iowa alumni
University of Minnesota alumni
American women historians
Political historians
Princeton University faculty
Lambda Literary Award-winning works
Year of birth missing (living people)